Großer Hafner is a  high partly-glaciated mountain of the Ankogel Group in the High Tauern range, located at the border between the Austrian states of Carinthia and Salzburg. It is the easternmost three-thousander peak (with at least  prominence) of the range, and also in the entire Alps.

Geography
The Hafner massif rises between the Radstadt Tauern and the Mur valley of the Salzburg Lungau region in the north and the Carinthian Malta valley in the south. It comprises Kleiner Hafner and Großer Sonnblick subpeaks, lying just to the southeast. In the south, the Malta valley leads to the Reißeck Group, while in the east, Katschberg Pass separates it from the neighbouring Gurktal Alps. 

The Hafner summit marks the eastern rim of the geological Hohe Tauern window. It has three glaciers, with the largest on its north face, and also comprises numerous Alpine lakes. The high mountain region, formerly a mining area, recently has become a centre of hydropower economy, most notably the Kölnbrein Dam in the southwest.

Ascent
 
The mountain is not a particularly hard climb. Most trails start from the Malta valley via Kölnbrein Dam. The eastern ascent from Rennweg am Katschberg is even easier, but with about  quite long.

References

External links

Entry at Aeiou Encyclopedia

Alpine three-thousanders
Ankogel Group
Mountains of the Alps
Mountains of Salzburg (state)